Christian comedy is a subgenre of comedy where the material presented is aimed towards a Christian audience. The performances are typically held on church grounds or at off-site, church-sponsored venues.

The material often contains Christian references, although this is not a requirement. From 2006 notable performers like Victoria Jackson, Tim Conway, Sinbad and Patricia Heaton appeared on a DVD series for the Christian market entitled, Thou Shalt Laugh.

Christian comedy is increasingly being used as an outreach, with the idea that a comedy show is an effective method to bring people into church who may have never thought about coming. Christian comedy is also used as a method to renew and refresh the spirit of church members, based on the Bible passage that says laughter does a heart good, like medicine.

Notable Christian comedians

John Branyan
Henry Cho
Tim Conway
John Crist
Ken Davis
Anthony Griffith
Tim Hawkins
Victoria Jackson
Milton Jones
Trey Kennedy
Mark Lowry
Taylor Mason
Jeff Allen [Mishler]
Tyler Perry
Chonda Pierce
Kerri Pomarolli
Anita Renfroe
 Marty Simpson
Brad Stine
Daren Streblow
Tim Vine
Mike Warnke

 Lester Barrie

Notable Christian comedy troupes
Blimey Cow
Isaac Air Freight
 Spin-off team, Mitch & Allen

See also

The Clown's Prayer
Clean comedy

References

Christian performing arts
Comedy
Religious comedy and humour